Kathrine Bertheau (born 31 March 1975) is a Swedish world champion bridge player.

Bridge accomplishments

Wins
 European Women Teams Championship: 2004
 Venice Cup (2) 2019, 2022

Runners-up
 Venice Cup (1) 2017

References

External links
 
 

1975 births
Living people
Swedish contract bridge players